Dixons Creek is a town in Victoria, Australia, 46 km north-east of Melbourne's central business district, located within the Shire of Yarra Ranges local government area.

The Post Office opened around 1902 and closed in 1967.

Dixons Creek has a primary school, with currently 7 
students. It is part of the Wollombi Cluster (11 small schools in the area).

Dixons Creek was hit hard by the Black Saturday fires and many houses were unfortunately destroyed.

References

Towns in Victoria (Australia)
Yarra Valley
Yarra Ranges